Haniska is a village and municipality in Košice-okolie District in the Kosice Region of eastern Slovakia.

History
Historically, the village was first mentioned in 1288.  Haniska has been its official name since 1921, and was a co-name in the early 20th century and most of the 19th century. Its Hungarian name, its original and former co-name, is Enyiczke, variously spelled Enjiczke, Enjicske, and Enyicske.

Geography
The village lies at an altitude of 233 metres and covers an area of 17.289 km².
It has a population of about 1370 people..

Genealogical resources

The records for genealogical research are available at the state archive "Statny Archiv in Kosice, Slovakia"
 Roman Catholic church records (births/marriages/deaths): 1714-1952 (parish A)
 Greek Catholic church records (births/marriages/deaths): 1791-1896 (parish B)
 Reformated church records (births/marriages/deaths): 1800-1895 (parish B)

See also
 List of municipalities and towns in Slovakia

External links
  
 Surnames of living people in Haniska

Villages and municipalities in Košice-okolie District